Heinz Mußmann (born 23 November 1945) is a German rower. He competed in the men's coxed pair event at the 1972 Summer Olympics.

References

1945 births
Living people
German male rowers
Olympic rowers of West Germany
Rowers at the 1972 Summer Olympics
Sportspeople from Hanover